In astronomy, angular diameter distance is a distance defined in terms of an object's physical size, and its angular size, as viewed from Earth:

Cosmology dependence 
The angular diameter distance depends on the assumed cosmology of the universe. The angular diameter distance to an object at redshift, is expressed in terms of the comoving distance,  as:

where  is the FLRW coordinate defined as:

In the currently favoured geometric model of our Universe, the "angular diameter distance" of an object is a good approximation to the "real distance", i.e. the proper distance when the light left the object.

Angular size redshift relation

The angular size redshift relation describes the relation between the angular size observed on the sky of an object of given physical size, and the object's redshift from Earth (which is related to its distance, from Earth). In a Euclidean geometry the relation between size on the sky and distance from Earth would simply be given by the equation:

Where  is small this approximates to:

However, in the ΛCDM model, the relation is more complicated. In this model, objects at redshifts greater than about 1.5 appear larger on the sky with increasing redshift.

The Mattig relation yields the angular-diameter distance, as a function of redshift z for a universe with ΩΛ = 0.  is the present-day value of the deceleration parameter, which measures the deceleration of the expansion rate of the Universe; in the simplest models,  corresponds to the case where the Universe will expand forever,  to closed models which will ultimately stop expanding and contract,  corresponds to the critical case – Universes which will just be able to expand to infinity without re-contracting.

Angular diameter turnover point
In reference to its appearance when plotted,  is sometimes referred to as the turnover point. Practically, this means that if we look at objects at increasing redshift (and thus objects that are increasingly far away) those at greater redshift will span a smaller angle on the sky only until , above which the objects will begin to span greater angles on the sky at greater redshift. The turnover point seems paradoxical because it contradicts our intuition that the farther something is, the smaller it will appear.

The turnover point occurs because of the expansion of the universe and the finite speed of light. Because the universe is expanding, objects that are now very distant were once much nearer. Because the speed of light is finite, the light reaching us from these now-distant objects must have left them long ago when they were nearer and spanned a larger angle on the sky. The turnover point can therefore tell us about the rate of expansion of the universe (or the relationship between the expansion rate and the speed of light if we do not assume the latter to be constant).

See also

 Distance measure
 Standard ruler

References

External links
 iCosmos: Cosmology Calculator (With Graph Generation )

Physical quantities
Distance